Young Narrator in the Breakers is the debut studio album by Brooklyn-based indie pop band Pavo Pavo. The album was recorded in and around Brooklyn and released on November 11, 2016 on Bella Union.

Critical reception 
Young Narrator in the Breakers received largely positive reviews from contemporary music critics. At Metacritic, which assigns a normalized rating out of 100 to reviews from mainstream critics, the album received an average score of 71, which indicates "generally favorable reviews."

Cameron Cook of Pitchfork praised the record, comparing vocalist Eliza Bagg to "a lovelorn alien reaching out from the farthest reaches of the galaxy," while AllMusic selected it as an Album Pick and wrote, "Pavo Pavo have achieved a collection that eschews the obvious, being undoubtedly hip yet simultaneous geeky in its references, and the resulting work is a real gem."

Economist and New York Times columnist Paul Krugman is a noted fan of the band and has featured their music in his blog.

Track listing

Personnel 

Pavo Pavo
 Oliver Hill
 Eliza Bagg
 Nolan Green
 Ian Romer
 Austin Vaughn

Additional personnel
 Dan Molad - producer, mix engineer
 Sam Cohen - producer
 TW Walsh - mastering engineer

References

2016 albums
Bella Union albums
Pavo Pavo albums